Adolf Heyduk (6 June 1835 – 6 February 1923) was a distinguished Czech poet and writer. Many of his poems were later set to music by Antonín Dvořák. The best known and most widely performed is the poignant and tender Songs My Mother Taught Me with its hauntingly exquisite setting, included in the repertoire of many renowned instrumentalists and vocalists.

Life
Born in Rychmburk (today Předhradí), he began his studies in Prague in 1850. After finishing his studies in 1859, he became a teacher in Prague, and later in Písek. In 1876, he began to teach at the Prague's gymnasium, and became the chairman of the literary section of the Umělecká beseda association. He married in Písek in 1877. His two daughters died.

Work

Lyric poetry
Básně 
Hořec a srdečník
V zátiší
Zaváté listy 
Na vlnách
Na černé hodince
Cimbál a husle
Lesní Kvítí

Epic poetry
Dřevorubec
Dědův odkaz
Ptačí motivy

19th-century Czech poets
Czech male poets
1835 births
1923 deaths
People from Chrudim District
Epic poets
Lyric poets
19th-century male writers
Burials at Vyšehrad Cemetery